Cold World is the third EP by industrial metal band Godflesh, released in late 1991 through Relativity Records. It was recorded and mixed during September 1991 as part of the Pure (1992) sessions.

The original EP was discontinued, but, in 1996, it was reissued along with the "Slateman" single on one disc through Earache as the compilation Slateman/Cold World.  Later, in August 2009, this was reissued as part of a triple-CD package which also included the EP Slavestate (1991) and the band's second album, Pure.

Critical reception

Cold World received lukewarm reviews. Writing for AllMusic, Ned Raggett considered the EP a largely unremarkable continuation of the band's previous EP, Slavestate. He said the EP's title track would have benefited from being included on Pure. Noel Gardner of The Quietus called Cold World a "curio", saying, "Rhythms are brought to the fore, vocals scaled back and jumbled among the overt volley of FX abuse; it sounds great but, again, the feeling is of a band trying their hand at something that wasn't really them."

Track listing

Personnel
Credits adapted from liners note.

G.C. Green – bass guitar, production
J.K. Broadrick – guitar, vocals, production
Robert Hampson – guitar (1)
Machines – rhythm, samples

References

1991 EPs
Godflesh EPs
Albums produced by Justin Broadrick
Earache Records EPs